USS Lea (DD-118) was a  in the United States Navy during World War I and World War II. She was named in honor of Edward Lea, a US Navy officer killed during the American Civil War.

Lea was laid down on 18 September 1917 by William Cramp & Sons, Philadelphia. The ship was launched on 29 April 1918, sponsored by Mrs. Harry E. Collins. The destroyer was commissioned on 2 October 1918, Lieutenant Commander David W. Bagley in command.

Service history
After service in the Atlantic with DesRon 19 during 1919, Lea transferred to the Pacific Fleet in 1920 and served primarily along the West Coast during the years between the wars. She was out of commission at San Diego from 22 June 1922 to 1 May 1930 and 7 April 1937 to 30 September 1939. She sailed for the East Coast to join the Neutrality Patrol, guarding the western Atlantic through the tense months before the US entry into World War II. She served in the force guarding transports carrying marines for the occupation of Iceland on 8 July 1941.

World War II
For the first 2 years of U.S. participation in the war, Lea had convoy escort duty in the North Atlantic, the Caribbean Sea, and along the eastern seaboard, hazarded by peak U-boat activity and dangerous weather conditions. She rescued survivors from stricken merchant ships as well as fighting off submarines and joining in several successful attacks.

The first of her many wartime rescues at sea came in February 1942, when she took on board the crew of Soviet merchant vessel Dvinoles, abandoned after collision damage. Later that month, 24 February, came a daylong battle with submarines when Lea and fellow escorts again and again dashed out from their convoy screen to keep down attacking U-boats which had sunk four of the merchantmen.

Between 22 April 1943 and 30 May, Lea joined the hunter-killer group formed around the escort carrier  in the first mission of such a group. On 21 May and 22 May, Bogues aircraft became the first to engage a wolfpack attempting to rendezvous for a mass attack on a convoy. So successful were their six attacks in protecting the convoy that the group was awarded the Presidential Unit Citation in which Lea shared.

Convoys escorted

Auxiliary service
On 31 December 1943, Lea was five days out of New York on convoy escort duty when she was rammed by a merchant ship. Towed to Bermuda and later Boston, she completed repairs on 28 June 1944, and began sailing from Newport as target ship for torpedo planes and escorting carriers during flight training. Between January and June 1945, she had similar duty off Florida. Arriving Philadelphia on 14 June, she decommissioned there on 20 July 1945. Lea was struck from the Navy Register on 13 August 1945. The ship was sold for scrapping to Boston Metals Salvage Company, Baltimore on 30 November 1945.

Awards
 Presidential Unit Citation
 Victory Medal with "DESTROYER" clasp
 American Defense Service Medal with "FLEET" clasp and "A" device
 American Campaign Medal with two battle stars 
 European-African-Middle Eastern Campaign Medal with one battle star
 World War II Victory Medal

As of 2013, no other ships in the United States Navy have borne this name.

References

External links
 NavSource Photos

 

Wickes-class destroyers
World War I destroyers of the United States
World War II destroyers of the United States
Ships built by William Cramp & Sons
1918 ships